"Osama bin Laden as the Crucified Christ" is a single from Against Me!, released on 7" coloured vinyl on April 18, 2015, on Total Treble Music, as a limited edition for Record Store Day 2015. The track, which originally appeared on the 2014 album Transgender Dysphoria Blues, appears in two versions: a live version, from 23 Live Sex Acts, and an exclusive alternate version referred to as the "extra dysphoric version" performed solely by frontwoman Laura Jane Grace.

Background
The single was released as a limited-edition 7" single for Record Store Day. The song, before its album was released in 2014, was first played in January 2012 at Slamdance Film Festival. As the title suggests, the song refers to the crucifixion of Jesus Christ and the death of Osama bin Laden in 2011. The lyrics also refer to executions of Benito Mussolini and his mistress Claretta "Clara" Petacci, as well as the public display of their corpses in Piazzale Loreto, in 1945.

Track listing

Personnel

Band 
 Laura Jane Grace – lead vocals, guitar, art direction, producer, recording engineer
 James Bowman – guitar, backing vocals (track 1)
 Inge Johansson – bass, backing vocals (track 1)
 Atom Willard – drums, percussion (track 1)

Production 
 Pete Matthews – recording engineer (track 2)
 Marc Hudson – mixing engineer, recording engineer (track 2)
 Mike Zirkel – mastering

Art and design 
 Christopher Norris – art direction
 Steak Mtn – design, typography, and illustration

See also
Against Me! discography

References

2014 songs
2015 singles
Against Me! songs
Works about the killing of Osama bin Laden
Songs written by Laura Jane Grace
Songs about Jesus